Antonio Raúl Rojano (born 27 April 1991) is an Argentine professional footballer who plays as a striker for Greek Super League 2 club Niki Volos.

Career
Born in Salliqueló, Rojano spent his early career in Argentina and Bolivia with Gimnasia La Plata, Villa San Carlos, Sportivo Italiano and Real Potosí. 

He signed for Scottish club Hamilton Academical in August 2017, but was not granted a work permit until October 2017, spending the two months in between training with the team. He left the club in July 2018 after his contract was cancelled by mutual consent.

After spending the first half of the 2018–19 season with Burgos, on 23 January 2019, he signed a season-long deal with Dinamo Tbilisi. In August 2019 he moved to Greek club Niki Volos.

References

1991 births
Living people
Argentine footballers
Club de Gimnasia y Esgrima La Plata footballers
Club Atlético Villa San Carlos footballers
Sportivo Italiano footballers
Club Real Potosí players
Hamilton Academical F.C. players
Burgos CF footballers
FC Dinamo Tbilisi players
Niki Volos F.C. players 
Argentine Primera División players
Primera B Metropolitana players
Bolivian Primera División players
Scottish Professional Football League players
Segunda División B players
Gamma Ethniki players
Super League Greece 2 players
Association football forwards
Argentine expatriate footballers
Argentine expatriate sportspeople in Bolivia
Expatriate footballers in Bolivia
Argentine expatriate sportspeople in Scotland
Expatriate footballers in Scotland
Argentine expatriate sportspeople in Georgia (country)
Expatriate footballers in Georgia (country)
Argentine expatriate sportspeople in Greece
Expatriate footballers in Greece
Sportspeople from Buenos Aires Province